The 2020 Chevrolet Silverado 250 was the 19th stock car race of the 2020 NASCAR Gander RV & Outdoors Truck Series season, the 15th iteration of the event, and the 3rd and final race of the Round of 10, making it the cutoff race for the first round. The race was held on Saturday, October 3, 2020, in Lincoln, Alabama at Talladega Superspeedway, a  permanent triangle-shaped superspeedway. The race took the scheduled 94 laps to complete. At race's end, Raphaël Lessard of Kyle Busch Motorsports would be declared the winner after a last lap wreck occurred coming into Turn 3. Trevor Bayne and Raphaël Lessard were side by side at the time of caution- at the last scoring loop, Lessard was declared the leader, and since the caution freezes the field at the moment of caution, Lessard would win his first ever NASCAR Gander RV & Outdoors Truck Series race, and as of now, his only win in the series. To fill out the podium, Trevor Bayne of Niece Motorsports and Chandler Smith of Kyle Busch Motorsports would finish 2nd and 3rd, respectively.

Christian Eckes and Todd Gilliland were both eliminated from the Playoffs after the race, not advancing to the Round of 8.

Background 

Talladega Superspeedway, originally known as Alabama International Motor Superspeedway (AIMS), is a motorsports complex located north of Talladega, Alabama. It is located on the former Anniston Air Force Base in the small city of Lincoln. The track is a tri-oval and was constructed in the 1960s by the International Speedway Corporation, a business controlled by the France family. Talladega is most known for its steep banking and the unique location of the start/finish line that's located just past the exit to pit road. The track currently hosts the NASCAR series such as the NASCAR Cup Series, Xfinity Series and the Gander RV & Outdoors Truck Series. Talladega is the longest NASCAR oval with a length of 2.66-mile-long (4.28 km) tri-oval like the Daytona International Speedway, which also is a 2.5-mile-long (4 km) tri-oval.

Entry list 

*Driver changed to Kaz Grala for the race due to Decker not being medically cleared to race.

**Withdrew.

Starting lineup 
The starting lineup was selected based on the results and fastest lap of the last race, the 2020 World of Westgate 200 and owner's points. As a result, Sheldon Creed of GMS Racing won the pole.

Race results 
Stage 1 Laps: 20

Stage 2 Laps: 20

Stage 3 Laps: 54

References 

2020 NASCAR Gander RV & Outdoors Truck Series
NASCAR races at Talladega Superspeedway
October 2020 sports events in the United States
2020 in sports in Alabama